The Maharaja's Diamond (Spanish:El diamante del Maharajá) is a 1946 Chilean film directed by Roberto de Ribón and starring Luis Sandrini.

Cast
 Guillermo Battaglia
 Chela Bon 
 Juan Corona
 Luis Sandrini 
 Maria Teresa Squella

References

Bibliography 
 Plazaola, Luis Trelles.  South American Cinema: Dictionary of Film Makers. La Editorial, UPR, 1989.

External links 
 

1946 films
1940s Spanish-language films
Chilean black-and-white films
Films set in India